Yang Zhi (born 15 January 1983) is a Chinese retired footballer who played for Beijing Guoan in the Chinese Super League from 2005 to the end of the 2019 season.

He retired on 3 August 2020.

Club career
Yang Zhi started his football career at second tier side Guangdong Xiongying after graduating from their youth academy. He quickly established himself within the squad in the 2002 season with Guangdong, playing in 26 league games. The following season he would play in a further 22 league games for Guangdong and help take them to a tenth-place finish. 

Yang's performances caught the eye of Chinese Super League side Beijing Guoan and he soon transferred to the club at the start of the 2005 season where he once again quickly established himself as the first-choice goalkeeper, playing in 21 league games in his debut season. The following seasons saw him become an integral member of the squad; and by the 2009 league season, he had aided them to win the top tier title. Right before the start of the 2012 season, Yang sustained an injury when he played for his home province of Guangdong in the 2012 Guangdong-Hong Kong Cup and was out for most of the season. He recovered in time to return and regain his starting role as goalkeeper for Beijing during the 2013 season.

International career
Yang made his debut for the Chinese national team on 10 August 2006 in a 4-0 win against Thailand, coming on as a substitute for Li Leilei. He would later make his competitive debut the following year on 28 October 2007 in a 1-0 win against Myanmar during 2010 FIFA World Cup qualification. However, it was not until the introduction of then manager Gao Hongbo that saw Yang promoted to first-choice goalkeeper when he named him in his first game on 29 May 2009 in a 1-1 draw against Germany.

Career statistics

Club statistics

International statistics

Honours

Club
Beijing Guoan
Chinese Super League: 2009
Chinese FA Cup: 2018

International
China PR national football team
East Asian Football Championship: 2010

Individual
Chinese Super League Team of the Year: 2007, 2008, 2009

References

External links

 
Player Profile at Sina.com.cn
Player stats at Sohu.com

1983 births
Living people
Beijing Guoan F.C. players
Chinese Super League players
Chinese footballers
Footballers from Guangzhou
Association football goalkeepers
China international footballers
2011 AFC Asian Cup players
21st-century Chinese people